Chenarud-e Jonubi Rural District is a rural district (dehestan) in Chenarud District, Chadegan County, Isfahan Province, Iran. At the 2006 census, its population was 2,651, in 570 families.  The rural district has 22 villages.

References 

Rural Districts of Isfahan Province
Chadegan County